Anthony Wilson was a school teacher and American politician. He served in the Georgia House of Representatives. He represented Camden County, Georgia.

Early life

Anthony Wilson was born in Georgia. His brother was Hercules Wilson. After the Reconstruction Acts were passed, Wilson was one of the first African-Americans to register to vote in the American South, registering in 1867.

Career

Wilson worked as a school teacher in Camden County, Georgia. He went ran for election to the Georgia House of Representatives and won. While serving in the House, Wilson lived with his brother Hercules and a fellow legislator with the last name of Fraiser.

Hercules did not run for re-election, but Anthony Wilson continued to serve in the house. In 1885, Wilson introduced a bill to ban racial discrimination at hotels, theaters and circuses. The bill failed to pass receiving only three votes, all from African-American legislators.

By 1888, he was only one of two African-Americans serving in the Georgia House, the other being S. A. McIvor. His last term was the 1892–93 session.

References

Republican Party members of the Georgia House of Representatives
African-American men in politics
19th-century African-American politicians
19th-century American politicians
People from Camden County, Georgia
African-American schoolteachers
Schoolteachers from Georgia (U.S. state)
Republican Party (United States) politicians
African-American state legislators in Georgia (U.S. state)
Year of birth missing
Year of death missing